Neuraminic acid (5-amino-3,5-dideoxy-D-glycero-D-galacto-non-2-ulosonic acid) is an acidic (in particular ulosonic) amino sugar with a backbone formed by nine carbon atoms. Although 9-carbon sugars do not occur naturally, neuraminic acid may be regarded as a theoretical 9-carbon ketose in which the first link of the chain (the –CH2OH at position 1) is oxidised into a carboxyl group (–C(=O)OH), the hydroxyl group at position 3 is deoxidised (oxygen is removed from it), and the hydroxyl group at position 5 is substituted with an amino group (–NH2). Neuraminic acid may also be visualized as the product of an aldol-condensation of pyruvic acid and D-mannosamine (2-amino-2-deoxy-mannose). 

Neuraminic acid does not occur naturally, but many of its derivatives are found widely distributed in animal tissues and in bacteria, especially in glycoproteins and gangliosides. The N- or O-substituted derivatives of neuraminic acid are collectively known as sialic acids, the predominant form in mammalian cells being N-acetylneuraminic acid. The amino group bears either an acetyl or a glycolyl group. The hydroxyl substituents may vary considerably: acetyl, lactyl, methyl, sulfate and phosphate groups have been found.

The name "neuraminic acid" was introduced by German scientist E. Klenk in 1941, in reference to the brain lipids from which it was derived as a cleavage product.

The IUPAC symbol used for neuraminic acid is Neu, and the residue is typically found with additional chemical modifications in biological systems. As a family, these residues are known as sialic acids. For example, N-acetylneuraminic acid, Neu5Ac, is typical in human glycoproteins.

Among their many biological functions, these structures are substrates for neuraminidase enzymes which cleave neuraminic acid residues. Human flu viruses have a neuraminidase enzyme, signified in the name "H#N#", where the H refers to an isoform of hemagglutinin and N refers to an isoform of viral neuraminidase.

See also
 Sialic acid
 N-Acetylneuraminic acid
 N-Glycolylneuraminic acid

References

Amino sugars
Monosaccharide derivatives
Sugar acids